The Goodrich Area School District is a public School district in Genesee County in the U.S. state of Michigan and in the Genesee Intermediate School District.

Geography
Goodrich Area Schools serves parts or all of Atlas Township, Michigan, Davison Township, Grand Blanc Township, Village of Goodrich in Genesee County with parts of Metamora and Hadley Township in Lapeer County  and Groveland Township and part Brandon Township in Oakland County.

Schools

Sports

Notable Athletes
Kyler Elsworth graduated from Goodrich High School in 2009.  In high school he was best known for wrestling.  He won back to back Division 3 State titles in 2008 and 2009.  He went on to be a line backer at Michigan State University where he was named the Most Valuable Player at the 2014 Rose Bowl.

References

External links
 

School districts in Michigan
Education in Genesee County, Michigan